Niranjan Behera (born 2 May 1984) is an Indian cricketer who plays for Odisha.

Early life 
Behera was born in 1984 in Cuttack of Odisha to Jayaram Behera and Manorama Behera. He has been married to a girl named Swagatika. He took admission to learn basics at a private cricket club based in Cuttack.

Career 
Behera started his cricketing career as an Allrounder playing List-A cricket in 1999-00 Vijay Hajare Trophy for Odisha cricket team. He made his debut in the 2002–03 Ranji Trophy for Odisha. He last played for Odisha against Gujarat cricket team in the 2013-14 Ranji Trophy Season. Behera was selected to coach the U-19 Odisha cricket team in 2018.

References

External links
 

1984 births
Living people
Indian cricketers
Odisha cricketers
People from Cuttack
Cricketers from Odisha